Duke Albrecht may refer to:
 Albert, Duke of Prussia (1490–1568)
 Albert, Duke of Luxembourg, Archduke of Austria (1559–1621)
 Albrecht, Duke of Saxe-Eisenach (1599-1644)
 Albrecht, Duke of Saxe-Coburg (1648–1699)
 Albert, Duke of Saxe-Teschen (1738–1822)
 Albrecht, Duke of Württemberg (1865–1939)
 Albrecht, Duke of Bavaria (1905–1996) 
 Albert of Saxe-Wittenberg (disambiguation)
 Duke Albrecht of Silesia, character in the ballet Giselle